Dungeon Encounters is a role-playing video game developed by Square Enix and Cattle Call and published by Square Enix. It was released for Microsoft Windows, PlayStation 4 and Nintendo Switch on October 14, 2021. Unlike most JRPGs, the game purposely uses minimalistic graphics and user interface, focusing on game mechanics. The game was positively received by critics for its deep mechanics. At the time of its release, it was the first game Hiroyuki Ito had directed in 14 years.

Reception 

Dungeon Encounters received "generally favorable reviews" for its PlayStation 4 and Switch versions, according to Metacritic. The Windows version received "mixed or average reviews".

Jenni Lada of Siliconera rated the Switch version 8/10 points, calling the game "made for the Switch" due to how it rewards the player for taking notes. Saying it was one of her best surprises of 2021, she commented that its looks were deceptive compared to how deep the game was and that she never had a short session. 

Roland Ingram of Nintendo Life rated the Switch version 8/10 stars, saying that it was more meaningful than other games despite its simple graphics. Calling it a "masterstroke of game design, character and narrative", he praised the game's storytelling, but criticized its music as repetitive, and the concept as not particularly novel.

Adam Vitale of RPG Site rated the PC version 8/10 points, calling it "not for everyone" and criticizing its music as "squawky", but calling its design "tight-knit" and "well-crafted". He compared it to "a third-person Wizardry, only even simpler".

References 

2021 video games
Fantasy video games
Japanese role-playing video games
Nintendo Switch games
PlayStation 4 games
Single-player video games
Square Enix games
Video games developed in Japan
Windows games
Cattle Call (company) games